2,5-Dimethoxy-4-fluoroamphetamine (DOF) is a psychedelic drug of the phenethylamine and amphetamine classes. Alexander Shulgin briefly describes DOF in his book PiHKAL:

DOF showed some stimulating effects in humans, but no psychedelic activity, after three doses of 6 mg spaced by one hour. Daniel Trachsel further suspected that the molar refraction of the important 4-substituent in DOF and 2C-F may be too low to activate the  5-HT2A receptor sufficiently. DOF more closely mimics the effects of the 4-unsubstituted 2,5-dimethoxyamphetamine than the effects of DOC, DOB, and DOI.

See also 
 2,5-Dimethoxy-4-Substituted Amphetamines

References 

Substituted amphetamines
Serotonin receptor agonists
Fluoroarenes
2,5-Dimethoxyphenethylamines